This page summarises the Australia men's national soccer team fixtures and results in 2003.

Summary
With no competitive fixtures scheduled, it was a relatively quiet year for the Socceroos having only 3 friendly matches, all away from home. However, the fixture in March against England made headlines due to Australia recording a famous 3–1 victory over their hosts. The match was also renowned for England making eleven substitutions at half time.

Two friendlies in the latter half of the year saw Ireland come from a goal down to win 2–1 in Dublin in August followed by a September win over Jamaica when Harry Kewell's second half goal gave Australia a 2–1 victory.

Record

Match results

Friendlies

Goal scorers

References

2003
2003 in Australian soccer
2003 national football team results